István Sági (born December 16, 1967) is a Hungarian politician, member of the National Assembly (MP) for Kunszentmárton (Jász-Nagykun-Szolnok County Constituency V) between 2010 and 2014.

He was elected member of the Committee on Education, Science and Research on May 14, 2010.

References

1967 births
Living people
Fidesz politicians
Members of the National Assembly of Hungary (2010–2014)
People from Heves